Washington Park, Chicago may refer to:

Washington Park (community area), Chicago, a Chicago community area
Washington Park (Chicago park), a public city park in the above community area
Washington Park Race Track, a historic horse racing track once located one block south of the above park
Washington Park Subdivision, a historic subdivision on the site of the former race track

See also
Washington Park Court District, a Chicago Landmark neighborhood
Dinah Washington Park, a public city park in the Chicago Park District
Harold Washington Park, a public city park in the Chicago Park District
Washington Heights, Chicago, a Chicago community area
Washington Square Park (Chicago), a public city park in the Chicago Park District